The Maryland Department of Public Safety and Correctional Services (DPSCS) is a government agency of the State of Maryland that performs a number of functions, including the operation of state prisons. It has its headquarters in Towson, Maryland, an unincorporated community that is also the seat of Baltimore County, Maryland, United States, located north of Maryland's largest city of Baltimore. Additional offices for correctional institutions supervision are located on Reisterstown Road in northwest Baltimore.

Organizational units
Some of the agencies contained within the Maryland Department of Public Safety and Correctional Services include:
 Criminal Injuries Compensation Board
 Division of Capital Construction and Facilities Maintenance
 Division of Correction
 Division of Parole and Probation
 Division of Pretrial Detention and Services (operates the former Baltimore City Jail - now the Baltimore City Detention Center and the pre-trial release programs in the city of Baltimore)
 Emergency Number Systems Board
 Handgun Permit Review Board
 Inmate Grievance Office
 Internal Investigative Division
 Information Technology and Communications Division
 Maryland Correctional Enterprises
 Maryland Parole Commission
 Office of the Inspector General
 Office of Planning, Policy, Regulations, and Statistics
 Office of the Secretary
 Police and Correctional Training Commissions
 Public Information Office
 Sundry Claims Board

Facilities

 Baltimore City Correctional Center, Baltimore (operating capacity 500 inmates)
 Baltimore City Detention Center (formerly historic Baltimore City Jail - established and constructed 1801, re-constructed 1858–1859, gutted, re-constructed and added wings, 1959–1965)
 Baltimore County Detention Center (formerly historic Baltimore County Jail)
 Baltimore Pre-Release Unit, Baltimore (capacity 201)
 Brockbridge Correctional Facility - Jessup
 Chesapeake Detention Facility (previously the Maryland Correctional Adjustment Center - also formerly known as "Super Max") - Baltimore (leased to U.S. Department of Justice and Federal Bureau of Prisons for detention of federal prisoners)
 Eastern Correctional Institution - Princess Anne, Somerset County
 Eastern Pre-Release Unit - Princess Anne, Somerset County (capacity 180)
 Maryland Correctional Institution - Hagerstown (constructed mid-1930s as third institution and initially served as penal farm)
 Jessup Correctional Institution - Jessup
 Maryland Correctional Institution - Jessup, Jessup
 Maryland Correctional Institution for Women - Jessup
 Maryland Correctional Training Center - Hagerstown (capacity 2800)
 Metropolitan Transition Center - Baltimore (formerly historic Maryland Penitentiary, established 1811)
 North Branch Correctional Institution - Cumberland, opened 2003 (capacity 1399)
 Patuxent Institution - Jessup
 Poplar Hill Pre-Release Unit (capacity 180)
 Roxbury Correctional Institution - Hagerstown
 Southern Maryland Pre-Release Unit (capacity 180)
 Western Correctional Institution - Cumberland (adjacent to North Branch Correctional Institution, opened in the early 1980s)

Associated facilities
  Central Booking and Intake Center - Baltimore (1995 expansion adjacent to old historic Baltimore City Jail - now Baltimore City Detention Center)

Closed facilities
 Herman L. Toulson Correctional Facility - Jessup
 Jessup Pre-Release Unit - Jessup
 Maryland House of Correction - Jessup

Proposed facilities
 New Youth Detention Facility (Baltimore City)
 New Women's Detention Facility (Baltimore City)

Death row
The "Death Row" for men was in the North Branch Correctional Institution in Western Maryland's Cumberland area. The execution chamber is in the Metropolitan Transition Center (the former Maryland Penetentiary). The five men who were on the State's "death row" were moved in June 2010 from the Maryland Correctional Adjustment Center. In December 2014, former Governor Martin O'Malley commuted the sentences of all Maryland death row inmates to life sentences.

Black Guerrilla Family 
In 2009, a federal indictment under the RICO Act charges that the Black Guerrilla Family gang was active in a number of facilities, including North Branch Correctional Institution, Western Correctional Institution, Eastern Correctional Institution, Roxbury Correctional Institution, Maryland Correctional Institution – Jessup, Maryland Correctional Institution – Hagerstown, Baltimore City Correctional Center, and Metropolitan Transition Center, and the Baltimore City Detention Center (formerly and also known as the Baltimore City Jail).

The gang had a statewide "supreme commander" as well as subordinate commanders in each facility. These leaders were assisted by other gang officials dubbed ministers of intelligence, justice, defense and education. These organizations enforced a code of conduct and smuggled contraband into the facilities.

Another prison gang, this one of mostly white prisoners, known as "D.M.I." Dead Man Incorporated was founded in Maryland prisons in 2001 or 2002 as an offshoot of the Black Guerrilla Family.

Fallen officers 
Since the establishment of the Maryland Department of Public Safety and Correctional Services, five officers have died while on duty.

See also

 List of law enforcement agencies in Maryland

National:
 List of United States state correction agencies
 Lists of United States state prisons

References

External links
 

State law enforcement agencies of Maryland
State corrections departments of the United States
 
Maryland